St. Andrew Church, Roman Catholic Bridgeport, Connecticut is part of the  Diocese of Bridgeport.

History 
The church dates from the 1960s and was designed by Lyons & Mather of Bridgeport.

References

External links 
 St. Andrew - Diocesan information 
 {http://www.parishesonline.com/scripts/HostedSites/Org.asp?ID=237 St. Andrew - Website]
 Diocese of Bridgeport

Saint Andrew Parish
1960s architecture in the United States
Roman Catholic Diocese of Bridgeport